Bruno Felipe Souza da Silva (born 26 May 1994), known as Bruno Felipe or just Bruno, is a Brazilian professional footballer who plays as a winger for Cypriot First Division club Pafos FC.

Club career

Atromitos
On 24 January 2018, Atromitos announced the signing of the Brazilian winger from 
LASK Linz on an 18-month deal.

Olympiacos
On 18 June 2019, Olympiacos announced the signing of Bruno Felipe for an estimated transfer fee of €500,000 on a three years' contract.

Aris
On 1 February 2021, he signed a two-and-a-half-year contract with Aris. On 20 August 2021, he joined Moldovan National Division club Sheriff Tiraspol.

Omonoia
On 4 June 2022, he signed a two years contract with Omonia.

Pafos
On 31 January, Pafos announced the signing of Bruno from AC Omonia for an undisclosed fee.

Career statistics

Honours
Olympiacos
Superleague Greece: 2019–20
Greek Cup: 2019–20

References

1994 births
Living people
Brazilian footballers
SC Austria Lustenau players
LASK players
Atromitos F.C. players
Olympiacos F.C. players
Aris Thessaloniki F.C. players
FC Sheriff Tiraspol players
2. Liga (Austria) players
Austrian Football Bundesliga players
Super League Greece players
Moldovan Super Liga players
Brazilian expatriate footballers
Expatriate footballers in Austria
Brazilian expatriate sportspeople in Austria
Expatriate footballers in Greece
Brazilian expatriate sportspeople in Greece
Expatriate footballers in Moldova
Brazilian expatriate sportspeople in Moldova
Association football wingers
Footballers from São Paulo